The Council of Epaone or Synod of Epaone was held in September 517 at Epaone (or Epao, near the present Anneyron) in the Burgundian Kingdom.

It was one of three national councils of bishops held around that time in former Roman Gaul: the council of Agde was held in 506 in the Visigothic Kingdom in the south and the council of Orléans in 511 for the Kingdom of the Franks. The synod enacted the first legislation against wooden altars, forbidding the building of any but stone altars. It also witnessed to the rise of the practice of mitigation of canonical penance in view of the changing times and social conditions of Christians.

Attendees 
 St. Viventiolus (515-523), who presided
 St. Avitus, also presiding.
 St. Constantinus, bishop of Gap.
 Catulinus, bishop of Embrun.
 Laymen were also present and had a chance to question the morality of the local clergymen.

Edicts passed 
 Canon 12: forbade bishops from alienating ecclesiastical property without the permission of their metropolitan.
 Canon 15: Attendance at Jewish banquets prohibited.
 Canon 16: allowed baptized heretics to be admitted to the Church by a rite of unction (Presbyteros, . . . si conversionem subitam petant, chrismate subvenire permittimus). This was the practice also in the East, but in Rome and Italy admission was by laying on of hands.
 Canon 26: forbade the consecration of any but stone Altars.
 Clergy forbidden to hunt. 
 Completely abrogated in the entire Kingdom the consecration of widows who are named Deaconesses.
 Canon 29 reduced to two years the penance that apostates were to undergo on their return to the Church, but obliged them to fast one day in three during those two years, to come to church and take their place at the penitents' door, and to leave with the catechumens. Any who objected to the new arrangement were to observe the much longer ancient penance.

References

The fullest reference appears to be The New Schaff-Herzog Encyclopedia of Religious Knowledge, Vol. IV: Draeseke–Goa  which includes facsimile images of the pages along with a searchable text version. The relevant data is on pages 149–150 and is reproduced below.

 "EPAO, SYNOD OF: A synod held in Sept., 517, at Epao or Epaone, a village to the south of Vienne, near the present Anneyron, at that time part of the kingdom of Burgundy, where a year earlier the Arian king Gundobad had been succeeded by his orthodox son Sigismund. It was attended by twenty-four bishops from all parts of the kingdom, on the invitation of Avitua of Vienne (q.v.). Laymen seem to have been present, after their participation had been declared lawful; canon axiv. permitted them to bring charges against any clergy who were justly accused of immorality. The forty canons passed at this meeting should be considered in connection with those of the synods of Agile (506) and Orleans (511; qq.v.). They were intended to do for the Burgundian kingdom what these had done for the Visigothic or Frankish — though the speedy dissolution of the former made their effect slight. Several of them, however, were included in a later (Spanish) collection of the canons of Agile (though with some modifications in the direction of less severity), and thus continued to have an influence on subsequent practise. The spirit of Avitus breathes through them all. An important section deals with the inalienability of ecclesiastical property; a more vigorous repression of Arianism is demanded, though the return of individuals to the Church is made easy. It appears that priests and deacons were married, and that the episcopal oversight embraced the monasteries. The enforcement of the rights of bishops corresponds to the treatment of the metropolitan power. The number of forbidden degrees for marriage is increased, in har mony with older legislation, apparently with an eye to the case of a royal official who had married his deceased wife's sister; this led to an attempt on the king's part to discipline the bishops, and to a firm pronouncement on their part at the first Synod of Lyons (before 523), at which eleven of the members of the Synod of Epao were present."
Bibliography: The Acta, ed. R. Peiper, are in MGH, Auct. ant., vi. 2 (1883), 165-175, cf. (ed. Friedrich Maassen) MGH, Concil., i (1893), 15 sqq.; Harduin, Concilia, ii. 1045 sqq.; Hefele, Conciliengeschichte, ii . 880 sqq., Eng. travel., iv. 107 sqq.; Neander, Christian Church, ii. 191, iii. b, 100."

External links
http://www.ccel.org/s/schaff/encyc/encyc04/htm/0165=149.htm
http://www.rotula.de/aniane/literatur/feuillebois.htm (in French)

Epaone
6th century in Francia
Epaone
Epaone
Altars
Epaone